Eilema squalida is a moth of the subfamily Arctiinae first described by Achille Guenée in 1862. It is found in Mauritius and Réunion, both in the Indian Ocean.

This species has a wingspan of about 40 mm.

See also
List of moths of Réunion
List of moths of Mauritius

References
Guenée 1862. Lépidoptères. In: Maillard, L., Notes sur l'île de la Réunion (Bourbon) (Annexe G).: 1–72; pls. 12–13.

Moths described in 1862
squalida
Moths of Mauritius
Moths of Réunion